The 1998 Gulf Club Champions Cup, is an annually organized football league tournament for club of the Arabian Peninsula. It was the 15th edition and was started on 5 February and finished with the final round on 16 February 1998, and all the matches were played in Oman. Al-Hilal won the title for the second time in their history.

Results

Round 1

Round 2

Round 3

Round 4

Round 5

Winner

References

 
 

GCC Champions League
Gulf Club Champions Cup, 1998